Presseck is a municipality  in the district of Kulmbach in Bavaria in Germany.

City arrangement

Presseck is arranged in the following boroughs:

References

Kulmbach (district)